Georgeantha is a monotypic genus of herbaceous, rhizomatous plant endemic to Western Australia. The sole species is Georgeantha hexandra. The genus is named after Western Australian botanist Alex George, and the specific epithet, "hexandra", is said to refer to the six (Greek, hexa) stamens (male).

References

Poales
Monotypic Poales genera
Endemic flora of Western Australia
Taxa named by Lawrence Alexander Sidney Johnson
Taxa named by Barbara G. Briggs